Emily Thomas may refer to:

 Emily Thomas (gymnast) (born 2001), Welsh gymnast
 Emily Thomas (snowboarder) (born 1973), Australian snowboarder
 Emily Thomas (Harukuna Receive), a character in Japanese manga series Harukana Receive